The San Francisco Giants are an American baseball team. Their 2012 season marked their 130th year in Major League Baseball, as well as their 55th year in San Francisco since their move from New York following the 1957 season, and the thirteenth at AT&T Park. The Giants finished with a record of 94–68, 1st place in the NL West, and defeated the Cincinnati Reds in five games in the Division Series thereby becoming the first National League team (8th in MLB history) to come back from a 2–0 deficit in a best-of-five series by sweeping three games in the opponent's park. The Giants defeated the St. Louis Cardinals in seven games after overcoming a 3-1 deficit in the NL Championship Series and advancing to the 2012 World Series to face the Detroit Tigers. They swept the Tigers in four games to win their second World Series title in three years.

Season standings

NL West standings

NL Division Winners

Record vs. opponents

Game log 

|- style="text-align:center;" style="background-color:#ffbbbb;"
| 1 || April 6 || @ Diamondbacks || 4–5 || Kennedy (1–0) || Lincecum (0–1) || Putz (1) || 49,130 || 0–1
|- style="text-align:center;" style="background-color:#ffbbbb;"
| 2 || April 7 || @ Diamondbacks || 4–5 || Hudson (1–0) || Bumgarner (0–1) || Putz (2) || 34,789 || 0–2
|- style="text-align:center;" style="background-color:#ffbbbb;"
| 3 || April 8 || @ Diamondbacks || 6–7 || Miley (1–0) || Affeldt (0–1) || Shaw (1) || 24,193 || 0–3
|- style="text-align:center;" style="background-color:#bbffbb;"
| 4 || April 9 || @ Rockies || 7–0 || Zito (1–0) || Chacín (0–1) || || 49,282 || 1–3
|- style="text-align:center;" style="background-color:#ffbbbb;"
| 5 || April 11 || @ Rockies || 8–17 || Reynolds (1–0) || Mota (0–1) || Chatwood (1) || 30,337 || 1–4
|- style="text-align:center;" style="background-color:#bbffbb;"
| 6 || April 12 || @ Rockies || 4–2 || Bumgarner (1–1) || Moyer (0–2) || Wilson (1) || 25,860 || 2–4
|- style="text-align:center;" style="background-color:#bbffbb;"
| 7 || April 13 || Pirates || 5–0 || Cain (1–0) || McDonald (0–1) || || 41,138 || 3–4
|- style="text-align:center;" style="background-color:#bbffbb;"
| 8 || April 14 || Pirates || 4–3 || López (1–0) || Resop (0–1) || || 41,657 || 4–4
|- style="text-align:center;" style="background-color:#ffbbbb;"
| 9 || April 15 || Pirates || 1–4 || Correia (1–0) || Vogelsong (0–1) || Hanrahan (1) || 41,766 || 4–5
|- style="text-align:center;" style="background-color:#ffbbbb;"
| 10 || April 16 || Phillies || 2–5 || Halladay (3–0) || Lincecum (0–2) || Papelbon (3) || 41,136 || 4–6
|- style="text-align:center;" style="background-color:#bbffbb;"
| 11 || April 17 || Phillies || 4–2 || Bumgarner (2–1) || Blanton (1–2) || Casilla (1) || 41,101 || 5–6
|- style="text-align:center;" style="background-color:#bbffbb;"
| 12 || April 18 || Phillies || 1–0  || Hensley (1–0) || Bastardo (0–1) || || 41,860 || 6–6
|- style="text-align:center;" style="background-color:#bbffbb;"
| 13 || April 20 || @ Mets || 4–3  || Romo (1–0) || Francisco (0–1) || Hensley (1) || 30,544 || 7–6
|- style="text-align:center;" style="background-color:#ffbbbb;"
| 14 || April 21 || @ Mets || 4–5 || Rauch (2–0) || Hensley (1–1) || || 33,844 || 7–7
|- style="text-align:center;" style="background-color:#bbbbbb;"
| – || April 22 || @ Mets ||colspan=7|Game Postponed (rain) (to be made up as a doubleheader on 4/23)
|- style="text-align:center;" style="background-color:#bbffbb;"
| 15 || April 23 || @ Mets || 6–1 || Lincecum (1–2) || Batista (0–2) || || 1 || 8–7
|- style="text-align:center;" style="background-color:#bbffbb;"
| 16 || April 23 || @ Mets || 7–2 || Bumgarner (3–1) || Gee (1–2) || || 23,866 || 9–7
|- style="text-align:center;" style="background-color:#ffbbbb;"
| 17 || April 24 || @ Reds || 2–9 || Latos (1–2) || Cain (1–1) || || 19,051 || 9–8
|- style="text-align:center;" style="background-color:#ffbbbb;"
| 18 || April 25 || @ Reds || 2–4 || Arredondo (2–0) || Hensley (1–2) || Marshall (4) || 17,115 || 9–9
|- style="text-align:center;" style="background-color:#bbffbb;"
| 19 || April 26 || @ Reds || 6–5 || López (2–0) || Marshall (0–2) || Casilla (2) || 17,317 || 10–9
|- style="text-align:center;" style="background-color:#ffbbbb;"
| 20 || April 27 || Padres || 3–5 || Luebke (3–1) || Hacker (0–1) || Street (3) || 41,908 || 10–10
|- style="text-align:center;" style="background-color:#bbffbb;"
| 21 || April 28 || Padres || 2–1 || Lincecum (2–2) || Bass (1–3) || Casilla (3) || 42,375 || 11–10
|- style="text-align:center;" style="background-color:#bbffbb;"
| 22 || April 29 || Padres || 4–1 || Bumgarner (4–1) || Richard (1–3) || Casilla (4) || 42,060 || 12–10

|- style="text-align:center;" style="background-color:#ffbbbb;"
| 23 || May 1 || Marlins || 1–2 || Nolasco (3–0) || Cain (1–2) || Bell (3) || 41,439 || 12–11
|- style="text-align:center;" style="background-color:#ffbbbb;"
| 24 || May 2 || Marlins || 2–3  || Cishek (3–0) || Casilla (0–1) || || 41,575 || 12–12
|- style="text-align:center;" style="background-color:#ffbbbb;"
| 25 || May 3 || Marlins || 2–3 || Sánchez (2–0) || Vogelsong (0–2) || Mujica (1) || 41,159 || 12–13
|- style="text-align:center;" style="background-color:#ffbbbb;"
| 26 || May 4 || Brewers || 4–6 || Loe (2–0) || Hensley (1–3) || Axford (6) || 41,082 || 12–14
|- style="text-align:center;" style="background-color:#bbffbb;"
| 27 || May 5 || Brewers || 5–2 || Bumgarner (5–1) || Wolf (2–3) || Casilla (5) || 41,135 || 13–14
|- style="text-align:center;" style="background-color:#bbffbb;"
| 28 || May 6 || Brewers || 4–3  || López (3–0) || Dillard (0–1) || || 41,796 || 14–14
|- style="text-align:center;" style="background-color:#ffbbbb;"
| 29 || May 7 || @ Dodgers || 1–9 || Lilly (4–0) || Zito (1–1) || || 43,713 || 14–15
|- style="text-align:center;" style="background-color:#bbffbb;"
| 30 || May 8 || @ Dodgers || 2–1 || Vogelsong (1–2) || Kershaw (2–1) || Casilla (6) || 32,799 || 15–15
|- style="text-align:center;" style="background-color:#ffbbbb;"
| 31 || May 9 || @ Dodgers || 2–6 || Wright (2–2) || Lincecum (2–3) || || 33,993 || 15–16
|- style="text-align:center;" style="background-color:#ffbbbb;"
| 32 || May 11 || @ Diamondbacks || 1–5 || Corbin (2–1) || Bumgarner (5–2) || || 35,792 || 15–17
|- style="text-align:center;" style="background-color:#bbffbb;"
| 33 || May 12 || @ Diamondbacks || 5–2 || Cain (2–2) || Cahill (2–4) || Casilla (7) || 31,719 || 16–17
|- style="text-align:center;" style="background-color:#bbffbb;"
| 34 || May 13 || @ Diamondbacks || 7–3 || Zito (2–1) || Saunders (2–3) || || 35,430 || 17–17
|- style="text-align:center;" style="background-color:#bbffbb;"
| 35 || May 14 || Rockies || 3–2 || Romo (2–0) || Brothers (1–2) || Casilla (8) || 41,254 || 18–17
|- style="text-align:center;" style="background-color:#ffbbbb;"
| 36 || May 15 || Rockies || 4–5 || Brothers (2–2) || Casilla (0–2) || Betancourt (7) || 41,332 || 18–18
|- style="text-align:center;" style="background-color:#ffbbbb;"
| 37 || May 16 || Cardinals || 1–4 || García (3–2) || Bumgarner (5–3) || Motte (7) || 41,324 || 18–19
|- style="text-align:center;" style="background-color:#bbffbb;"
| 38 || May 17 || Cardinals || 7–5 || Cain (3–2) || Wainwright (2–5) || Casilla (9) || 41,225 || 19–19
|- style="text-align:center;" style="background-color:#bbffbb;"
| 39 || May 18 || Athletics || 8–6 || Zito (3–1) || Parker (1–2) || Casilla (10) || 41,477 || 20–19
|- style="text-align:center;" style="background-color:#bbffbb;"
| 40 || May 19 || Athletics || 4–0 || Vogelsong (2–2) || Ross (2–4) || || 41,411 || 21–19
|- style="text-align:center;" style="background-color:#ffbbbb;"
| 41 || May 20 || Athletics || 2–6 || Colón (4–4) || Lincecum (2–4) || || 41,378 || 21–20
|- style="text-align:center;" style="background-color:#bbffbb;"
| 42 || May 21 || @ Brewers || 4–3  || Casilla (1–2) || Pérez (0–1) || || 31,644 || 22–20
|- style="text-align:center;" style="background-color:#bbffbb;"
| 43 || May 22 || @ Brewers || 6–4 || Cain (4–2) || Marcum (2–3) || Casilla (11) || 30,451 || 23–20
|- style="text-align:center;" style="background-color:#ffbbbb;"
| 44 || May 23 || @ Brewers || 5–8 || Veras (3–1) || Zito (3–2) || Axford (7) || 37,691 || 23–21
|- style="text-align:center;" style="background-color:#bbffbb;"
| 45 || May 24 || @ Marlins || 14–7 || Vogelsong (3–2) || Sánchez (2–3) || || 24,099 || 24–21
|- style="text-align:center;" style="background-color:#ffbbbb;"
| 46 || May 25 || @ Marlins || 6–7 || Jennings (1–0) || Lincecum (2–5) || Cishek (1) || 27,123 || 24–22
|- style="text-align:center;" style="background-color:#ffbbbb;"
| 47 || May 26 || @ Marlins || 3–5 || Buehrle (5–4) || Bumgarner (5–4) || Choate (1) || || 24–23
|- style="text-align:center;" style="background-color:#bbffbb;"
| 48 || May 27 || @ Marlins || 3–2 || Cain (5–2) || Nolasco (5–3) || Casilla (12) || 30,199 || 25–23
|- style="text-align:center;" style="background-color:#bbffbb;"
| 49 || May 28 || Diamondbacks ||  4–2 || Zito (4–2) || Cahill (2–5) || Casilla (13) || 42,295 || 26–23
|- style="text-align:center;" style="background-color:#bbffbb;"
| 50 || May 29 || Diamondbacks || 3–1 || Hensley (2–3) || Shaw (1–3) || Casilla (14) || 41,371 || 27–23
|- style="text-align:center;" style="background-color:#ffbbbb;"
| 51 || May 30 || Diamondbacks || 1–4 || Kennedy (4–5) || Lincecum (2–6) || Hernandez (1) || 41,328 || 27–24

|- style="text-align:center;" style="background-color:#bbffbb;"
| 52 || June 1 || Cubs || 4–3 || Bumgarner (6–4) || Maholm (4–4) || López (1) || 41,100 || 28–24
|- style="text-align:center;" style="background-color:#bbffbb;"
| 53 || June 2 || Cubs || 2–1 || Cain (6–2) || Garza (2–4) || Romo (1) || 41,239 || 29–24
|- style="text-align:center;" style="background-color:#bbffbb;"
| 54 || June 3 || Cubs || 2–0 || Zito (5–2) || Wood (0–2) || Romo (2) || 41,112 || 30–24
|- style="text-align:center;" style="background-color:#bbffbb;"
| 55 || June 4 || Cubs || 3–2 || Vogelsong (4–2) || Mármol (0–2) || Affeldt (1) || 41,542 || 31–24
|- style="text-align:center;" style="background-color:#ffbbbb;"
| 56 || June 5 || @ Padres || 5–6 || Street (1–0) || Edlefsen (0–1) || || 30,662 || 31–25
|- style="text-align:center;" style="background-color:#bbffbb;"
| 57 || June 6 || @ Padres || 6–5 || Bumgarner (7–4) || Richard (2–7) || Romo (3) || 22,269 || 32–25
|- style="text-align:center;" style="background-color:#bbffbb;"
| 58 || June 7 || @ Padres || 8–3 || Cain (7–2) || Marquis (2–5) || Casilla (15) || 22,015 || 33–25
|- style="text-align:center;" style="background-color:#ffbbbb;"
| 59 || June 8 || Rangers || 0–5 || Harrison (8–3) || Zito (5–3) || || 41,163 || 33–26
|- style="text-align:center;" style="background-color:#bbffbb;"
| 60 || June 9 || Rangers || 5–2 || Vogelsong (5–2) || Feldman (0–5) || Casilla (16) || 41,704 || 34–26
|- style="text-align:center;" style="background-color:#ffbbbb;"
| 61 || June 10 || Rangers || 0–5 || Ross (6–0) || Lincecum (2–7) || || 42,418 || 34–27
|- style="text-align:center;" style="background-color:#bbffbb;"
| 62 || June 12 || Astros || 6–3 || Bumgarner (8–4) || Norris (5–4) || Casilla (17) || 42,100 || 35–27
|- style="text-align:center;" style="background-color:#bbffbb;"
| 63 || June 13 || Astros || 10–0 || Cain (8–2) || Happ (4–7) || || 42,298 || 36–27
|- style="text-align:center;" style="background-color:#ffbbbb;"
| 64 || June 14 || Astros || 3–6 || Rodríguez (6–4) || Zito (5–4) || Myers (16) || 41,662 || 36–28
|- style="text-align:center;" style="background-color:#bbffbb;"
| 65 || June 15 || @ Mariners || 4–2 || Vogelsong (6–2) || Vargas (7–6) || Casilla (18) || 29,818 || 37–28
|- style="text-align:center;" style="background-color:#ffbbbb;"
| 66 || June 16 || @ Mariners || 4–7 || Iwakuma (1–0) || Lincecum (2–8) || Wilhelmsen (4) || 30,589 || 37–29
|- style="text-align:center;" style="background-color:#ffbbbb;"
| 67 || June 17 || @ Mariners || 1–2 || Wilhelmsen (3–1) || Romo (2–1) || || 40,603 || 37–30
|- style="text-align:center;" style="background-color:#bbffbb;"
| 68 || June 18 || @ Angels || 5–3 || Cain (9–2) || Williams (6–5) || Casilla (19) || 41,234 || 38–30
|- style="text-align:center;" style="background-color:#ffbbbb;"
| 69 || June 19 || @ Angels || 5–12 || Wilson (8–4) || Zito (5–5) || || 38,010 || 38–31
|- style="text-align:center; style="background-color:#ffbbbb;"
| 70 || June 20 || @ Angels || 0–6 || Weaver (7–1) || Vogelsong (6–3) || || 40,321 || 38–32
|- style="text-align:center;" style="background-color:#bbffbb;"
| 71 || June 22 || @ Athletics || 5–4 || Hensley (3–3) || Cook (2–2) || Casilla (20) || 35,067 || 39–32
|- style="text-align:center;" style="background-color:#bbffbb;"
| 72 || June 23 || @ Athletics || 9–8 || Bumgarner (9–4) || Ross (2–7) || Hensley (2) || 36,067 || 40–32
|- style="text-align:center; style="background-color:#ffbbbb;"
| 73 || June 24 || @ Athletics || 2–4 || Miller (2–0) || Casilla (1–3) || || 36,067 || 40–33
|- style="text-align:center;" style="background-color:#bbffbb;"
| 74 || June 25 || Dodgers || 8–0 || Zito (6–5) || Eovaldi (0–4) || || 42,164 || 41–33
|- style="text-align:center;" style="background-color:#bbffbb;"
| 75 || June 26 || Dodgers || 2–0 || Vogelsong (7–3) || Kershaw (5–4) || Casilla (21) || 42,664 || 42–33
|- style="text-align:center;" style="background-color:#bbffbb;"
| 76 || June 27 || Dodgers || 3–0 || Lincecum (3–8) || Billingsley (4–7) || Romo (4) || 42,245 || 43–33
|- style="text-align:center;" style="background-color:#bbffbb;"
| 77 || June 28 || Reds || 5–0 || Bumgarner (10–4) || Cueto (9–4) || || 41,626 || 44–33
|- style="text-align:center;" style="background-color:#ffbbbb;"
| 78 || June 29 || Reds || 1–5 || Leake (3–5) || Cain (9–3) || || 41,960 || 44–34
|- style="text-align:center;" style="background-color:#ffbbbb;"
| 79 || June 30 || Reds || 1–2 || Latos (7–2) || Zito (6–6) || || 42,135 || 44–35

|- style="text-align:center;" style="background-color:#bbffbb;"
| 80 || July 1 || Reds || 4–3 || Casilla (2–3) || Arredondo (4–2) || || 42,039 || 45–35
|- style="text-align:center;" style="background-color:#ffbbbb;"
| 81 || July 3 || @ Nationals || 3–9 || Zimmermann (5–6) || Lincecum (3–9) || || 36,985 || 45–36
|- style="text-align:center;" style="background-color:#ffbbbb;"
| 82 || July 4 || @ Nationals || 4–9 || Jackson (5–4) || Bumgarner (10–5) || || 35,806 || 45–37
|- style="text-align:center;" style="background-color:#ffbbbb;"
| 83 || July 5 || @ Nationals || 5–6 || Clippard (2–2) || Casilla (2–4) || || 29,819 || 45–38
|- style="text-align:center;" style="background-color:#bbffbb;"
| 84 || July 6 || @ Pirates || 6–5 || Zito (7–6) || Bédard (4–10) || Romo (5) || 37,565 || 46–38
|- style="text-align:center;" style="background-color:#ffbbbb;"
| 85 || July 7 || @ Pirates || 1–3 || McDonald (9–3) || Vogelsong (7–4) || Hanrahan (23) || 37,543 || 46–39
|- style="text-align:center;" style="background-color:#ffbbbb;"
| 86 || July 8 || @ Pirates || 2–13 || Burnett (10–2) || Lincecum (3–10) || || 28,954 || 46–40
|- style="text-align:center;" style="background-color:#bbffbb;"
| 87 || July 13 || Astros || 5–1 || Bumgarner (11–5) || Rodríguez (7–7) || Casilla (22) || 42,116 || 47–40
|- style="text-align:center;" style="background-color:#bbffbb;"
| 88 || July 14 || Astros || 3–2  || Affeldt (1–1) || Myers (0–4) || || 42,171 || 48–40
|- style="text-align:center;" style="background-color:#bbffbb;"
| 89 || July 15 || Astros || 3–2 || Cain (10–3) || Norris (5–7) || Casilla (23) || 42,265 || 49–40
|- style="text-align:center;" style="background-color:#bbffbb;"
| 90 || July 17 || @ Braves || 9–0 || Zito (8–6) || Jurrjens (3–3) || || 29,623 || 50–40
|- style="text-align:center;" style="background-color:#bbffbb;"
| 91 || July 18 || @ Braves || 9–4  || Casilla (3–4) || Varvaro (1–1) || || 29,410 || 51–40
|- style="text-align:center;" style="background-color:#ffbbbb;"
| 92 || July 19 || @ Braves || 2–3 || Hudson (8–4) || Bumgarner (11–6) || Kimbrel (28) || 29,635 || 51–41
|- style="text-align:center;" style="background-color:#bbffbb;"
| 93 || July 20 || @ Phillies || 7–2 || Lincecum (4–10) || Worley (5–6) || || 44,205 || 52–41
|- style="text-align:center;" style="background-color:#bbffbb;"
| 94 || July 21 || @ Phillies || 6–5  || Romo (3–1) || Papelbon (2–4) || Casilla (24) || 45,989 || 53–41
|- style="text-align:center;" style="background-color:#ffbbbb;"
| 95 || July 22 || @ Phillies || 3–4  || Kendrick (4–8) || Penny (0–1) || || 44,551 || 53–42
|- style="text-align:center;" style="background-color:#bbffbb;"
| 96 || July 23 || Padres || 7–1 || Vogelsong (8–4) || Richard (7–11) || || 42,430 || 54–42
|- style="text-align:center;" style="background-color:#bbffbb;"
| 97 || July 24 || Padres || 3–2 || Casilla (4–4) || Thatcher (0–4) || || 42,559 || 55–42
|- style="text-align:center;" style="background-color:#ffbbbb;"
| 98 || July 25 || Padres || 3–6 || Marquis (6–9) || Lincecum (4–11) || Street (17) || 41,871 || 55–43
|- style="text-align:center;" style="background-color:#ffbbbb;"
| 99 || July 27 || Dodgers || 3–5  || Tolleson (1–0) || Romo (3–2) || Jansen (20) || 41,681 || 55–44
|- style="text-align:center;" style="background-color:#ffbbbb;"
| 100 || July 28 || Dodgers || 0–10 || Billingsley (6–9) || Zito (8–7) || || 42,030 || 55–45
|- style="text-align:center;" style="background-color:#ffbbbb;"
| 101 || July 29 || Dodgers || 0–4 || Kershaw (8–6) || Vogelsong (8–5) || || 41,902 || 55–46
|- style="text-align:center;" style="background-color:#ffbbbb;"
| 102 || July 30 || Mets || 7–8  || Edgin (1–0) || Casilla (4–5) || Acosta (1) || 41,300 || 55–47
|- style="text-align:center;" style="background-color:#bbffbb;"
| 103 || July 31 || Mets || 4–1 || Lincecum (5–11) || Harvey (1–1) || Affeldt (2) || 41,774 || 56–47

|- style="text-align:center;" style="background-color:#ffbbbb;"
| 104 || August 1 || Mets || 1–2 || Niese (8–5) || Cain (10–4) || Parnell (4) || 42,188 || 56–48
|- style="text-align:center;" style="background-color:#ffbbbb;"
| 105 || August 2 || Mets || 1–9 || Young (3–5) || Zito (8–8) || || 41,843 || 56–49
|- style="text-align:center;" style="background-color:#bbffbb;"
| 106 || August 3 || @ Rockies || 16–4 || Vogelsong (9–5) || Sánchez (1–9) || || 30,176 || 57–49
|- style="text-align:center;" style="background-color:#bbffbb;"
| 107 || August 4 || @ Rockies || 11–6 || Bumgarner (12–6) || Francis (3–4) || || 35,242 || 58–49
|- style="text-align:center;" style="background-color:#bbffbb;"
| 108 || August 5 || @ Rockies || 8–3 || Lincecum (6–11) || Chatwood (1–2) || || 28,804 || 59–49
|- style="text-align:center;" style="background-color:#ffbbbb;"
| 109 || August 6 || @ Cardinals || 2–8 || Westbrook (11–8) || Cain (10–5) || || 38,652 || 59–50
|- style="text-align:center;" style="background-color:#bbffbb;"
| 110 || August 7 || @ Cardinals || 4–2 || Zito (9–8) || Lynn (13–5) || Affeldt (3) || 41,293 || 60–50
|- style="text-align:center;" style="background-color:#bbffbb;"
| 111 || August 8 || @ Cardinals || 15–0 || Vogelsong (10–5) || Kelly (2–5) || || 36,906 || 61–50
|- style="text-align:center;" style="background-color:#ffbbbb;"
| 112 || August 9 || @ Cardinals || 1–3 || Wainwright (10–10) || Bumgarner (12–7) || Motte (25) || 32,810 || 61–51
|- style="text-align:center;" style="background-color:#ffbbbb;"
| 113 || August 10 || Rockies || 0–3 || Chatwood (2–2) || Lincecum (6–12) || Betancourt (20) || 41,729 || 61–52
|- style="text-align:center;" style="background-color:#bbffbb;"
| 114 || August 11 || Rockies || 9–3 || Cain (11–5) || Pomeranz (1–7) || || 42,483 || 62–52
|- style="text-align:center;" style="background-color:#bbffbb;"
| 115 || August 12 || Rockies || 9–6 || Hensley (4–3) || Belisle (3–4) || || 41,492 || 63–52
|- style="text-align:center;" style="background-color:#ffbbbb;"
| 116 || August 13 || Nationals || 2–14 || Gonzalez (15–6) || Vogelsong (10–6) || || 42,050 || 63–53
|- style="text-align:center;" style="background-color:#bbffbb;"
| 117 || August 14 || Nationals || 6–1 || Bumgarner (13–7) || Zimmermann (9–7) || || 42,081 || 64–53
|- style="text-align:center;" style="background-color:#ffbbbb;"
| 118 || August 15 || Nationals || 4–6 || Strasburg (14–5) || Lincecum (6–13) || Clippard (25) || 42,133 || 64–54
|- style="text-align:center;" style="background-color:#bbffbb;"
| 119 || August 17 || @ Padres || 10–1 || Cain (12–5) || Ohlendorf (4–4) || || 38,755 || 65–54
|- style="text-align:center;" style="background-color:#bbffbb;"
| 120 || August 18 || @ Padres || 8–7 || Mijares (3–2) || Brach (1–3) || Hensley (3) || 33,849 || 66–54
|- style="text-align:center;" style="background-color:#ffbbbb;"
| 121 || August 19 || @ Padres || 1–7 || Richard (10–12) || Vogelsong (10–7) || || 28,605 || 66–55
|- style="text-align:center;" style="background-color:#bbffbb;"
| 122 || August 20 || @ Dodgers || 2–1 || Bumgarner (14–7) || Kershaw (11–7) || López (2) || 36,878 || 67–55
|- style="text-align:center;" style="background-color:#bbffbb;"
| 123 || August 21 || @ Dodgers || 4–1 || Lincecum (7–13) || Blanton (8–12) || López (3) || 56,000 || 68–55
|- style="text-align:center;" style="background-color:#bbffbb;"
| 124 || August 22 || @ Dodgers || 8–4 || Cain (13–5) || Capuano (11–9) || || 40,173 || 69–55
|- style="text-align:center;" style="background-color:#bbffbb;"
| 125 || August 23 || Braves || 5–2 || Zito (10–8) || Hanson (12–6) || Romo (6) || 41,645 || 70–55
|- style="text-align:center;" style="background-color:#bbffbb;"
| 126 || August 24 || Braves || 5–3 || Vogelsong (11–7) || Sheets (4–4) || López (4) || 41,486 || 71–55
|- style="text-align:center;" style="background-color:#ffbbbb;"
| 127 || August 25 || Braves || 3–7 || Minor (7–10) || Bumgarner (14–8) || || 41,679 || 71–56
|- style="text-align:center;" style="background-color:#ffbbbb;"
| 128 || August 26 || Braves || 1–7 || Hudson (13–4) || Lincecum (7–14) || || 41,735 || 71–57
|- style="text-align:center;" style="background-color:#bbffbb;"
| 129 || August 28 || @ Astros || 3–2 || Casilla (5–5) || López (5–3) || Romo (7) || 13,516 || 72–57
|- style="text-align:center;" style="background-color:#bbffbb;"
| 130 || August 29 || @ Astros || 6–4 || Kontos (1–0) || Keuchel (1–7) || López (5) || 13,207 || 73–57
|- style="text-align:center;" style="background-color:#bbffbb;"
| 131 || August 30 || @ Astros || 8–4 || Vogelsong (12–7) || Rodriguez (1–9) || Romo (8) || 12,835 || 74–57
|- style="text-align:center;" style="background-color:#ffbbbb;"
| 132 || August 31 || @ Cubs || 4–6 || Volstad (2–9) || Bumgarner (14–9) || Mármol (17) || 32,476 || 74–58

|- style="text-align:center;" style="background-color:#bbffbb;"
| 133 || September 1 || @ Cubs || 5–2 || Lincecum (8–14) || Germano (2–5) || Romo (9) || 32,477 || 75–58
|- style="text-align:center;" style="background-color:#bbffbb;"
| 134 || September 2 || @ Cubs || 7–5 || Casilla (6–5) || Mármol (2–3) || López (6) || 39,760 || 76–58
|- style="text-align:center;" style="background-color:#bbffbb;"
| 135 || September 3 || Diamondbacks || 9–8  || Romo (4–2) || Shaw (1–5) || || 42,045 || 77–58
|- style="text-align:center;" style="background-color:#ffbbbb;"
| 136 || September 4 || Diamondbacks || 6–8  || Collmenter (4–3) || Kontos (1–1) || || 41,038 || 77–59
|- style="text-align:center;" style="background-color:#ffbbbb;"
| 137 || September 5 || Diamondbacks || 2–6 || Cahill (10–11) || Bumgarner (14–10) || || 41,035 || 77–60
|- style="text-align:center;" style="background-color:#bbffbb;"
| 138 || September 7 || Dodgers || 5–2 || Casilla (7–5) || Beckett (6–13) || Romo (10) || 41,666 || 78–60
|- style="text-align:center;" style="background-color:#ffbbbb;"
| 139 || September 8 || Dodgers || 2–3 || Belisario (5–1) || Affeldt (1–2) || League (11) || 41,791 || 78–61
|- style="text-align:center;" style="background-color:#bbffbb;"
| 140 || September 9 || Dodgers || 4–0 || Zito (11–8) || Blanton (9–13) || || 41,517 || 79–61
|- style="text-align:center;" style="background-color:#ffbbbb;"
| 141 || September 10 || @ Rockies || 5–6 || Moscoso (2–1) || Vogelsong (12–8) || Betancourt (28) || 25,817 || 79–62
|- style="text-align:center;" style="background-color:#bbffbb;"
| 142 || September 11 || @ Rockies || 9–8 || Kontos (2–1) || Torres (4–2) || López (7) || 26,631 || 80–62
|- style="text-align:center;" style="background-color:#bbffbb;"
| 143 || September 12 || @ Rockies || 8–3 || Lincecum (9–14) || Francis (5–5) || || 24,182 || 81–62
|- style="text-align:center;" style="background-color:#bbffbb;"
| 144 || September 14 || @ Diamondbacks || 6–2 || Cain (14–5) || Skaggs (1–2) || || 31,856 || 82–62
|- style="text-align:center;" style="background-color:#bbffbb;"
| 145 || September 15 || @ Diamondbacks || 3–2 || Zito (12–8) || Miley (15–10) || Romo (11) || 39,169 || 83–62
|- style="text-align:center;" style="background-color:#ffbbbb;"
| 146 || September 16 || @ Diamondbacks || 2–10 || Corbin (6–7) || Vogelsong (12–9) || || 29,051 || 83–63
|- style="text-align:center;" style="background-color:#bbffbb;"
| 147 || September 17 || Rockies || 2–1 || Bumgarner (15–10) || Moscoso (3–2) || Romo (12) || 41,280 || 84–63
|- style="text-align:center;" style="background-color:#bbffbb;"
| 148 || September 18 || Rockies || 6–3 || Lincecum (10–14) || Francis (5–6) || || 41,718 || 85–63
|- style="text-align:center;" style="background-color:#bbffbb;"
| 149 || September 19 || Rockies || 7–1 || Cain (15–5) || Chatwood (4–5) || || 41,292 || 86–63
|- style="text-align:center;" style="background-color:#bbffbb;"
| 150 || September 20 || Rockies || 9–2 || Zito (13–8) || de la Rosa (0–1) || || 41,157 || 87–63
|- style="text-align:center;" style="background-color:#bbffbb;"
| 151 || September 21 || Padres || 5–1 || Vogelsong (13–9) || Kelly (2–2) || || 41,728 || 88–63
|- style="text-align:center;" style="background-color:#bbffbb;"
| 152 || September 22 || Padres || 8–4 || Bumgarner (16–10) || Werner (2–2) || || 42,418 || 89–63
|- style="text-align:center;" style="background-color:#ffbbbb;"
| 153 || September 23 || Padres || 4–6 || Stults (7–3) || Hensley (4–4) || Street (22) || 41,511 || 89–64
|- style="text-align:center;" style="background-color:#ffbbbb;"
| 154 || September 25 || Diamondbacks || 2–7 || Collmenter (5–3) || Lincecum (10–15) || || 41,153 || 89–65
|- style="text-align:center;" style="background-color:#bbffbb;"
| 155 || September 26 || Diamondbacks || 6–0 || Cain (16–5) || Miley (16–11) || || 41,516 || 90–65
|- style="text-align:center;" style="background-color:#bbffbb;"
| 156 || September 27 || Diamondbacks || 7–3 || Zito (14–8) || Corbin (6–8) || || 41,128 || 91–65
|- style="text-align:center;" style="background-color:#bbffbb;"
| 157 || September 28 || @ Padres || 3–1 || Vogelsong (14–9) || Werner (2–3) || Casilla (25) || 32,691 || 92–65
|- style="text-align:center;" style="background-color:#ffbbbb;"
| 158 || September 29 || @ Padres || 3–7 || Stults (8–3) || Bumgarner (16–11) || || 42,397 || 92–66
|- style="text-align:center;" style="background-color:#bbffbb;"
| 159 || September 30 || @ Padres || 7–5 || Loux (1–0) || Street (2–1) || Romo (13) || 33,407 || 93–66

|- style="text-align:center;" style="background-color:#ffbbbb;"
| 160 || October 1 || @ Dodgers || 2–3 || League (2–6) || Casilla (7–6) || || 33,624 || 93–67
|- style="text-align:center;" style="background-color:#bbffbb;"
| 161 || October 2 || @ Dodgers || 4–3 || Zito (15–8) || Capuano (12–12) || Romo (14) || 42,473 || 94–67
|- style="text-align:center;" style="background-color:#ffbbbb;"
| 162 || October 3 || @ Dodgers || 1–5 || Kershaw (14–9) || Hensley (4–5) || || 34,014 || 94–68

Postseason Game Log

|- style="text-align:center; style="background-color:#ffbbbb;"
| 1 || October 6 || Reds || 2–5 || LeCure (1–0) || Cain (0–1) || || 43,492 || 0–1
|- style="text-align:center; style="background-color:#ffbbbb;"
| 2 || October 7 || Reds || 0–9 || Arroyo (1–0) || Bumgarner (0–1) || || 43,505 || 0–2
|- style="text-align:center; style="background-color:#bbffbb;"
| 3 || October 9 || @ Reds || 2–1  || Romo (1–0) || Broxton (0–1) || || 44,501 || 1–2
|- style="text-align:center; style="background-color:#bbffbb;"
| 4 || October 10 || @ Reds || 8–3 || Lincecum (1–0) || Leake (0–1) || || 44,375 || 2–2
|- style="text-align:center; style="background-color:#bbffbb;"
| 5 || October 11 || @ Reds || 6–4 || Cain (1–1) || Latos (0–1) || Romo (1) || 44,142 || 3–2

|- style="text-align:center; style="background-color:#ffbbbb;"
| 1 || October 14 || Cardinals || 4–6 || Mujica (1–0) || Bumgarner (0–1) || Motte (1) || 42,534 || 0–1
|- style="text-align:center; style="background-color:#bbffbb;"
| 2 || October 15 || Cardinals || 7–1 || Vogelsong (1–0) || Carpenter (0–1) || || 42,679 || 1–1
|- style="text-align:center; style="background-color:#ffbbbb;"
| 3 || October 17 || @ Cardinals || 1–3 || Lohse (1–0) || Cain (0–1) || Motte (2) || 45,850 || 1–2
|- style="text-align:center; style="background-color:#ffbbbb;"
| 4 || October 18 || @ Cardinals || 3–8 || Wainwright (1–0) || Lincecum (0–1) || || 47,062 || 1–3
|- style="text-align:center; style="background-color:#bbffbb;"
| 5 || October 19 || @ Cardinals || 5–0 || Zito (1–0) || Lynn (0–1) || || 47,075 || 2–3
|- style="text-align:center; style="background-color:#bbffbb;"
| 6 || October 21 || Cardinals || 6–1 || Vogelsong (2–0) || Carpenter (0–2) || || 43,070 || 3–3
|- style="text-align:center; style="background-color:#bbffbb;"
| 7 || October 22 || Cardinals || 9–0 || Cain (1–1) || Lohse (1–1) || || 43,056 || 4–3

|- style="text-align:center; style="background-color:#bbffbb;"
| 1 || October 24 || Tigers || 8–3 || Zito (1–0) || Verlander (0–1) || || 42,855 || 1–0
|- style="text-align:center; style="background-color:#bbffbb;"
| 2 || October 25 || Tigers || 2–0 || Bumgarner (1–0) || Fister (0–1) || Romo (1) || 42,982 || 2–0
|- style="text-align:center; style="background-color:#bbffbb;"
| 3 || October 27 || @ Tigers || 2–0 || Vogelsong (1–0) || Sánchez (0–1) || Romo (2) || 42,262 || 3–0
|- style="text-align:center; style="background-color:#bbffbb;"
| 4 || October 28 || @ Tigers || 4–3  || Casilla (1–0) || Coke (0–1) || Romo (3) || 42,152 || 4–0

Roster

Events
October 30, 2011 – The Giants re-sign LHP Javier López to a two-year contract and pick up a one-year option on LHP Jeremy Affeldt.
November 7, 2011 – OF Melky Cabrera is acquired in a trade with the Kansas City Royals for LHP Jonathan Sánchez.
December 6, 2011 – OF Ángel Pagán is acquired in a trade with the New York Mets for OF Andrés Torres and RHP Ramon Ramírez.
December 12, 2011 – The Giants re-sign IF Mike Fontenot to a one-year contract and tender contracts to nine other arbitration-eligible players (Ps Tim Lincecum, Ryan Vogelsong, Sergio Romo and Santiago Casilla; IFs Pablo Sandoval and Emmanuel Burriss; OFs Nate Schierholtz and recent-trade acquisitions Melky Cabrera and Ángel Pagán). IF Jeff Keppinger and C Eli Whiteside are allowed to become free agents.
January 27, 2012 – The Giants sign IF Ryan Theriot to a one-year contract.
March 9, 2012 – In a spring training game, C Buster Posey returns to action for the first time since the injury which ended his 2011 season.
March 30, 2012 – IF Mike Fontenot is released.
April 2, 2012 – The Giants and RHP Matt Cain agree to a six-year contract extension worth at least $127 million.
April 4, 2012 – The Giants acquire P George Kontos from the New York Yankees in a trade for C Chris Stewart.  Spring training concludes with relative newcomers Gregor Blanco, Héctor Sánchez, Brett Pill, Clay Hensley, and Dan Otero included on the 25-man roster.
April 9, 2012 – Barry Zito pitches a complete game shutout against the Colorado Rockies at Coors Field for his first shutout as a member of the Giants.  The game is the Giants' first win of the year after an 0–3 start.
April 13, 2012 – Matt Cain pitches a one-hit shutout in a 5–0 victory over the Pittsburgh Pirates.  The single hit by opposing pitcher James McDonald is the only baserunner allowed by Cain in the game.
April 15, 2012 – Closer Brian Wilson is diagnosed with a season-ending elbow injury requiring Tommy John surgery.
April 17, 2012 – The Giants and LHP Madison Bumgarner agree on a new six-year contract extension.
April 25, 2012 – IF Joaquin Arias is recalled from Fresno as Aubrey Huff is placed on the 15-day disabled list.
April 25, 2012 – Pablo Sandoval sets a franchise record with a 19-game hitting streak to start the season.  The streak will ultimately reach 20 games.
May 3, 2012 – 3B Pablo Sandoval breaks the hamate bone in his left hand and is placed on the disabled list, Sandoval broke his hamate bone in his right hand the year before.
May 7, 2012 – RHP Guillermo Mota tests positive for a PED and is suspended for 100 games.  Aubrey Huff returns to the roster to take his place.
May 29, 2012 – Melky Cabrera sets a new San Francisco Giants record with 50 hits in the month of May.  He would finish the month with 51 hits, tying Randy Winn for the Giants' San Francisco record for most hits in any month.
June 5, 2012 – Freddy Sanchez has back surgery, ending his attempts to come back from a season-ending injury in June 2011.
June 10, 2012 – George Kontos is called up from Fresno, completing the bullpen.
June 12, 2012 – Madison Bumgarner hits his first major league home run while striking out 12 batters.  The previous Giant to hit a home run and throw 10+ strikeouts in a game before Bumgarner was Mike Krukow, who was announcing the game.
June 12, 2012 – 3B Pablo Sandoval returns to the lineup, while 3B Conor Gillaspie is demoted to Fresno.
June 13, 2012 – Matt Cain throws a perfect game with 125 pitches thrown and 14 strikeouts. Cain's 125 pitches is the most pitches thrown in a perfect game and his 14 strikeouts ties Sandy Koufax's record for most strikeouts thrown in a perfect games.
June 28, 2012 – LHP Madison Bumgarner throws the first shutout of his Major League career against the Cincinnati Reds. It is the fourth game in four consecutive shutout victories, the first three against the arch-rival Los Angeles Dodgers.
June 29, 2012 – RHP Brad Penny, previously signed to a minor-league contract, is called up to the major league roster.
July 1, 2012 – OF Melky Cabrera, P Matt Cain, C Buster Posey, and 3B Pablo Sandoval are named to the NL roster for the All-Star Game, each starting for their respected positions.
July 6, 2012 – RHP Sergio Romo takes over the closer role from RHP Santiago Casilla.
July 10, 2012 – OF Melky Cabrera is named MVP of the All-Star Game played in Kansas City, going 2 for 3 with a home run, 2 runs scored and 2 RBI as the National League routs the American League 8–0.  Matt Cain, the starting pitcher for the NL, pitches 2 shutout innings to earn the win.  3B Pablo Sandoval breaks the game open with a bases-loaded triple in the first inning.  C Buster Posey catches 5 shutout innings while drawing a walk and scoring a run.
July 13, 2012 – LHP Madison Bumgarner becomes the leadoff pitcher in the starting rotation, swapping spots with Tim Lincecum.
July 27, 2012 – IF Marco Scutaro is acquired, along with cash, via trade from the Rockies for infielder Charlie Culberson.  IF Emmanuel Burriss is designated for assignment.
July 31, 2012 – OF Hunter Pence is acquired via trade from the Philadelphia Phillies for OF Nate Schierholtz and minor league prospects C Tommy Joseph, and RHP Seth Rosin. 
August 6, 2012 – The Giants claim LHP José Mijares off waivers from the Kansas City Royals.
August 15, 2012 – OF Melky Cabrera is suspended for 50 games after testing positive for elevated levels of testosterone. At the time, he had a major league-leading 159 hits and was second in the NL with a .346 batting average.
August 31, 2012 – OF Xavier Nady, previously acquired on a minor-league contract, is promoted to the major league roster.
September 15, 2012 – OF Ángel Pagán sets the Giants' San Francisco-era record with his 13th triple of the season at Arizona's Chase Field, breaking a record jointly held by Willie Mays and Steve Finley.
September 21, 2012 – C Buster Posey is named recipient of the team's 2012 Willie Mac Award.
September 22, 2012 – The Giants clinch their second NL West title in three years with an 8–4 victory over the San Diego Padres at AT&T Park.  Sergio Romo gets Mark Kotsay to line out to Ángel Pagán for the final out.
October 2, 2012 – The Giants defeat the Los Angeles Dodgers 4–3 at Dodger Stadium, eliminating the Dodgers from postseason contention.
October 11, 2012 – The Giants defeat the Cincinnati Reds 6–4 at Great American Ball Park, winning the NLDS 3 games to 2.  Buster Posey caps a six-run fifth inning with a grand slam home run off Mat Latos to propel the Giants to a 6–0 lead.  The Reds would slowly come back, but with two runners on, the Giants holding a two-run lead, and the potential winning run at the plate in the bottom of the ninth inning, Sergio Romo retired Jay Bruce on a fly ball following a 12-pitch struggle before striking out Scott Rolen to end the series.  The Giants become the first National League team of the Wild Card era to come back from a two-game deficit to win a five-game postseason series, and are the first team overall to do so by winning the final three games on the road.
October 22, 2012 – The Giants defeat the St. Louis Cardinals 9–0 at AT&T Park to win Game 7 of the NLCS and the National League pennant.  Matt Cain pitches 5 2/3 shutout innings as the Giants break the game open with a five-run third inning highlighted by a bases-clearing broken bat hit by Hunter Pence.  In a driving downpour, Sergio Romo gets Matt Holliday to pop out to series MVP Marco Scutaro to end the game.  Scutaro tied an LCS record with 14 hits in the series.  The Giants outscore the Cardinals 20–1 over the last three games to come back from a 3–1 series deficit and tie the 1985 Kansas City Royals with six consecutive wins while facing elimination in the same postseason.
October 24, 2012 – In Game 1 of the 2012 World Series, Pablo Sandoval ties a World Series record by hitting three home runs in one game, two of them against starting pitcher Justin Verlander, the reigning 2011 winner of the AL Cy Young, the AL Pitching Triple Crown, and the AL MVP.  The Giants defeat the Detroit Tigers 8–3.
October 27, 2012 – With a 2–0 victory over the Detroit Tigers in Game 3 of the 2012 World Series, the Giants become the first team to post consecutive shutouts in a World Series since the Baltimore Orioles did so in 1966.
October 28, 2012 – The Giants defeat the Detroit Tigers 4–3 in 10 innings at Comerica Park to complete a four-game sweep and become 2012 World Series Champions.  Marco Scutaro singles home Ryan Theriot with the decisive run in the top of the 10th inning before Sergio Romo strikes out the side in the bottom of the frame, getting Miguel Cabrera looking for the third out to end it.  Pablo Sandoval is named series MVP.
October 31, 2012 – The Giants celebrate their World Series victory with a parade down Market Street in downtown San Francisco.
November 15, 2012 – Buster Posey wins the National League Most Valuable Player award.

Postseason

Division Series

The San Francisco Giants defeated the Cincinnati Reds to advance to the 2012 National League Championship Series.

Game 1, October 6
9:37 p.m. (EDT) at AT&T Park in San Francisco, California

Game 2, October 7
Sunday, October 7, 2012 – 9:37 pm (ET) at AT&T Park in San Francisco, California

Game 3, October 9
Tuesday, October 9, 2012 at Great American Ball Park in Cincinnati

Game 4, October 10
Wednesday, October 10, 2012 at Great American Ball Park in Cincinnati

Game 5, October 11
Thursday, October 11, 2012 at Great American Ball Park in Cincinnati

Championship Series

The San Francisco Giants defeated the St. Louis Cardinals for the National League title.

Game 1, October 14
Sunday, October 14, 2012 at AT&T Park in San Francisco, California

Game 2, October 15
Monday, October 15, 2012 at AT&T Park in San Francisco, California

Game 3, October 17
Wednesday, October 17, 2012 at Busch Stadium in St. Louis, Missouri

Game 4, October 18
Thursday, October 18, 2012 at Busch Stadium in St. Louis, Missouri

Game 5, October 19
Friday, October 19, 2012 at Busch Stadium in St. Louis, Missouri

Game 6, October 21
Sunday, October 21, 2012 – 7:45 p.m. (EDT) at AT&T Park in San Francisco, California

Game 7, October 22
Monday, October 22, 2012 at AT&T Park in San Francisco, California

World Series

The Giants swept the Detroit Tigers 4–0 to win the World Series Championship. The sweep marks as the franchise's first-ever in a playoffs or championship while in San Francisco.

Game 1, October 24
Wednesday, October 24, 2012 at AT&T Park in San Francisco, California

Game 2, October 25
Thursday, October 25, 2012 at AT&T Park in San Francisco, California

Game 3, October 27
Saturday, October 27, 2012 at Comerica Park in Detroit, Michigan

Game 4, October 28

Sunday, October 28, 2012 – 8:15 p.m. (EDT) at Comerica Park in Detroit, Michigan

Batting

Note: G = Games played; AB = At bats; R = Runs scored; H = Hits; 2B = Doubles; 3B = Triples; HR = Home runs; RBI = Runs batted in; AVG = Batting average; SB = Stolen bases

Pitching

Note: W = Wins; L = Losses; ERA = Earned run average; G = Games pitched; GS = Games started; SV = Saves; IP = Innings pitched; H = Hits allowed; R = Runs allowed; ER = Earned runs allowed; BB = Walks allowed; K = Strikeouts

Farm system

References

External links
2012 San Francisco Giants schedule at MLB.com
2012 San Francisco Giants statistics at Baseball Reference
2012 San Francisco Giants schedule at Baseball Reference

San Francisco Giants
San Francisco Giants seasons
San Francisco Giants
National League West champion seasons
National League champion seasons
World Series champion seasons